is the nineteenth studio album by the Japanese heavy metal band Loudness. It was released in 2004 in Japan. On April 6, 2005, the band released the English version of the album, the first entirely sung in English since 2001. An international edition was released on August 9, 2005, published by Drakkar, with a different track listing, a different cover and little differences in the production of the solo parts. The album cover marks the return of the band's classic logo, which was originally used from 1985 to 1988. A special international release of the album contains as bonus tracks the entire Rockshocks album of self-covers from the 1980s.

Track listings
Music by Akira Takasaki, lyrics by Minoru Niihara

Japanese release
"Racing" - 00:29
"Exultation" - 4:42
"Lunatic" - 4:06
"Believe It or Not" - 4:52
"Power Generation" - 4:03
"Speed Maniac" - 5:19
"Live for the Moment" - 4:39
"Crazy Samurai" - 5:21
"Tomorrow Is Not Promised" - 6:31
"Telomerase" - 5:50
"R.I.P." - 5:15
"Misleading Man" - 6:20
"Don't Know Nothing" - 6:07
"Unknown Civilians" - 3:58

International release
"Racing"
"Exultation"
"Lunatic"
"Live for the Moment"
"Crazy Samurai"
"Speed Maniac"
"R.I.P."
"Telomerase"
"Tomorrow Is Not Promised"
"Believe It or Not"
"Misleading Man"
"Power Generation"
"Don't Know Nothing"
"Unknown Civilians"

Personnel
Loudness
Minoru Niihara - vocals
Akira Takasaki - guitars
Masayoshi Yamashita - bass
Munetaka Higuchi - drums

Production
Masatoshi Sakimoto - engineer, mixing
Masayoshi Sugai, Yuki Mitome - assistant engineers
Yoichi Aikawa - mastering
Norikazu Shimano, Shinji Hamasaki - supervisors
Junji Tada - executive producer

References

2004 albums
Loudness (band) albums
Japanese-language albums
Tokuma Shoten albums